The In-Laws may refer to:

 The In-Laws (1979 film), directed by Arthur Hiller and starring Alan Arkin and Peter Falk
 The In-Laws (2003 film), a remake of the 1979 original, directed by Andrew Fleming and starring Michael Douglas and Albert Brooks
 The In-Laws (TV series), a 2011 drama series broadcast on Mediacorp TV Channel 8

See also
 In-Laws, an American TV sitcom
 , a 1981 Chinese film